The Emeryville Greenway is a pedestrian and bicycle path in the East Bay region of the San Francisco Bay Area, constructed and maintained by the City of Emeryville along what was previously a railroad right-of-way.

Route

The Greenway begins at the northeast corner of the Emeryville City Limits, and runs southwestward through the city.

History

The Greenway follows what was once the Emeryville portion of the 9th Street Line of the Southern Pacific's East Bay Electric Lines, a transbay commuter system in competition with the Key System.

References

External links

 City of Emeryville - Emeryville Greenway

Bike paths in the San Francisco Bay Area
Parks in Berkeley, California
Rail trails in California
Trails in the San Francisco Bay Area